The men's decathlon at the 2017 World Championships in Athletics was held at the Olympic Stadium on .

Summary

Before the competition started, there were a lot of athletes considered to be possible medal contenders. World leader Rico Freimuth (GER), Götzis winner Damian Warner (CAN) had shown solid performances throughout the season. Olympic silver medallist Kevin Mayer(FRA) had the best PB of the athletes, but had not done a decathlon in 2017. Ilya Shkurenev (ANA) had scored more than 8600 points, but hadn't been competing with the rest of the decathletes for nearly two years because of the ban of the Russian team. Another question mark was behind Trey Hardee (USA), the champion of 2009 and 2011. If he was able to reproduce his form of earlier years, he could be a contender as well.

The first four times in the 100 metres were Warner, Freimuth, Karl Robert Saluri (EST) and Mayer. Warner's 10.50 was the best of the day but not as exceptional as his  of 10.15.  Sutthisak Singkhon (THA) had the best long jump, though still over 20 cm short of his best from July, his  jump was a centimeter longer than Kai Kazmirek (GER), who moved into contention behind his teammate Freimuth and the other top 100 runners.  In the shot put, Meyer assumed the lead with the second best throw  behind Lindon Victor (GRN) 15.86. Hardee moved into third.  Kazmirek moved into second place with the best high jump of the day , but Mayer maintained the lead as one of several to clear 2.08 m.  And Kazmirek ended the first day still in second with the best 400 of 47.17 as Mayer's 48.26 kept him close enough to maintain the lead.

Starting the second day, Warner's 13.63 hurdles put him back in third, with Freimuth and Mayer close behind to take the top two positions.  Both Hardee and Shkurenev disappeared from the leader board after crashing over the fourth hurdle.  With a  discus throw, Freimuth gained over 4 metres on Mayer and pulled to within 24 points.  A 48.79 m put Oleksiy Kasyanov (UKR) into third.  Pau Tonnesen (ESP) have the best pole vault at 5.40 m but he was out of contention.  Kazmirek and Mayer tied at the next best height  to allow Mayer to separate in the lead and Kazmirek to move back to third.  Janek Õiglane (EST) threw the javelin a  71.73 m in the javelin to move into fourth place, Mayer's  was more than 3 and a half metres longer than the German teammates, giving him a solid lead going in to the final event.  Mayer's 4:36.73 1500 beat both Germans to win going away.  Kazmirek beat Freimuth by three and a half seconds in the race, but still finished 76 points behind him in the final tally.

The competition is notable for being the second decathlon in the World Championships history with the highest fraction of athletes (over 41%) not finishing the competition. The decathlon during the 1997 World Championships in Athletics similarly featured 34 athletes, of whom 14 were non-finishers.

Records
Before the competition records were as follows:

The following records were set at the competition:

Qualification standards
The standard to qualify automatically for entry was 8100 points.

Schedule
The event schedule, in local time (UTC+1), was as follows:

Results

100 metres
The 100 metres took place on 11 August in four heats as follows:

The overall results were as follows:

Long jump
The long jump took place on 11 August in two groups both starting at 11:11. The results were as follows:

Shot Put
The shot put took place on 11 August in two groups both starting at 12:55. The results were as follows:

High jump
The high jump took place on 11 August in two groups, Group A started at 17:00 and Group B at 17:01. The results were as follows:

400 metres
The 400 metres took place on 11 August in four heats as follows:

The overall results were as follows:

110 metres hurdles
The 110 metres hurdles took place on 12 August in four heats as follows:

The overall results were as follows:

Discus throw
The discus throw took place on 12 August in two groups, Group A started at 11:00 and Group B at 12:10. The results were as follows:

Pole vault
The pole vault took place on 12 August in two groups, Group A started at 12:58 and Group B at 14:08. The results were as follows:

Javelin throw
The javelin throw took place on 12 August in two groups, Group A started at 17:30 and Group B at 18:55. The results were as follows:

1500 metres
The 1500 metres took place on 12 August at 20:55. The results were as follows (photo finish):

Final standings
The final standings were as follows:

References

Decathlon
Decathlon at the World Athletics Championships